Kozani Stadium is a multi-use stadium in Kozani, Greece. It is currently used mostly for football matches and is the home stadium of Kozani F.C. The stadium holds 4,000 and was built in 1955.

1955 establishments in Greece
Football venues in Greece